Gol Khandan-e Qadim (also Romanized as Gol Khandān-e Qadīm, Gol Khandān Qadīm, and Golkhandān-e Qadīm; also known as Gol Khandān and Golkhandān) is a village in, and the capital of, Gol Khandan Rural District of Bumehen District of Pardis County, Tehran province, Iran. At the 2006 National Census, its population was 250 in 66 households, when it was in Siyahrud Rural District of the Central District of Tehran County. The following census in 2011 counted 175 people in 52 households. The latest census in 2016 showed a population of 553 people in 177 households; it was the largest village in its rural district. By this time, it was in the newly established Pardis County.

References 

Pardis County

Populated places in Tehran Province

Populated places in Pardis County